TEU may refer to:

 Tertiary Education Union, an education trade union in New Zealand
 TEU (IATA code) for Manapouri Aerodrome, New Zealand
 Treaty on European Union, formal name of the Maastricht Treaty (1992), one of the primary Treaties of the EU
 Twenty-foot Equivalent Unit, a measure used for capacity in container transportation